Bryan Smithson (born June 18, 1985) is an American professional basketball player who formerly played for the Academics Heidelberg of the German Basketball League ProA.

References

External links
UNC Asheville Bio
German League Profile
Eurobasket.com Profile

1985 births
Living people
American expatriate basketball people in Germany
Basketball players from Georgia (U.S. state)
Middle Tennessee Blue Raiders men's basketball players
People from Kennesaw, Georgia
Point guards
Sportspeople from Cobb County, Georgia
UNC Asheville Bulldogs men's basketball players
USC Heidelberg players
American men's basketball players